Statistics of Swiss Super League in the 1963–64 season.

Overview
There were fourteen teams contesting in the 1963–64 Nationalliga A, these were the top 12 teams from the previous season 1962–63 and the two newly promoted teams Schaffhausen and Cantonal Neuchatel. The Championship was played in a double round-robin, the champions were to be qualified for 1964–65 European Cup and the bottom placed two teams in the table were to be relegated. The championship was won by La Chaux-de-Fonds. Swiss Cup winners were Lausanne-Sport. Relegated were Schaffhausen and Cantonal Neuchatel.

League standings

Results

References

Sources
 Switzerland 1963–64 at RSSSF

Swiss Football League seasons
Swiss
1963–64 in Swiss football